A Promiscuous Judge is a judicial officer in Colombia who administers both civil and criminal law. These judges are appointed to serve in municipalities or corregimientos that have very low case loads and thus do not merit the presence of specialized municipal judges. Often they service nearby communities and operate in rural areas, often in geographically isolated posts.

They are not to be confused with puisne Causes Judges (Jueces de Pequeñas Causas). Whereas Promiscuous judges operate mainly on a territorial basis, Judges of puisne causes deal with "trifle" subject matters, that is, all those claiming under 40 Colombian minimum legal salaries. Whereas  Promiscuous judges operate in the rural periphery, Puisne causes judges are situated in urban centers where there is a big case load.

Notable people that served as promiscuous judges include:

 Carlos Gaviria Díaz, former Municipal Promiscuous Judge of Rionegro
 Horacio Serpa Uribe, former Municipal Promiscuous Judge of Tona

References

Judiciary of Colombia
Colombian legal terminology